Bathurst-Ilford Road is a  New South Wales country road linking Ilford to the regional hub of Bathurst.

Route
Bathurst-Ilford Road commences at the intersection with Castlereagh Highway in Ilford and heads in a south-westerly direction, eventually crossing the Turon River and passing the historic town of Sofala. It then continues in a southerly direction and passes through Wattle Flat and Peel, before eventually ending at the intersection with Great Western Highway in Kelso, just east of Bathurst, which itself acts as a major highway hub with the Great Western, Mid-Western Highway and Mitchell Highways - and O'Connell Road to Oberon - meet.

It is fully sealed over its entire length, but many road maps still show sections of it as unsealed.

In conjunction with Bylong Valley Way from Castlereagh Highway near Ilford to Golden Highway near Sandy Hollow, this very quiet and scenic route provides a leisurely alternative to going through Sydney to travel between the Hunter Region and Bathurst.

History
The passing of the Main Roads Act of 1924 through the Parliament of New South Wales provided for the declaration of Main Roads, roads partially funded by the State government through the Main Roads Board (later the Department of Main Roads, and eventually Transport for NSW). Main Road No. 54 was declared along this road on 8 August 1928, from the intersection with Mudgee-Ilford Road (today Castlereagh Highway) in Ilford, via Sofala to Bathurst (and continuing southwards eventually to Goulburn); with the passing of the Main Roads (Amendment) Act of 1929 to provide for additional declarations of State Highways and Trunk Roads, this was amended to Trunk Road 54 on 8 April 1929.

The passing of the Roads Act of 1993 through the Parliament of New South Wales updated road classifications and the way they could be declared within New South Wales. Under this act, the road today retains its declaration as part of Main Road 54, between Ilford and Kelso.

Major intersections

References

See also

 List of highways in New South Wales

Highways in New South Wales